Yuliya Aleksandrovna Gushchina (born 4 March 1983 in Novocherkassk, Rostov Oblast) is a Russian sprinter who specializes in the 200 metres.

On 30 November 2017 her results from the 2012 Summer Olympics were disqualified as a result of a positive doping test.

Career
Gushchina represented Russia at the 2008 Summer Olympics in Beijing competing at the 4x100 metres relay, together with Aleksandra Fedoriva, Yuliya Chermoshanskaya and Yevgeniya Polyakova. In their first round heat they placed second behind Jamaica, but in front of Germany and China. With this result they qualified for the final in which they sprinted to 42.31 seconds, the first place and the gold medal. Belgium and Nigeria took the other medals. The Jamaican team did not finish due to a mistake in the baton exchange. In August 2016, Gushchina and her three Russian teammates were stripped of their Olympic gold medal due to a doping violation by Chermoshanskaya.

With the 2017 announcement of the disqualification of the 2012 Russian 4x400 team, due to the doping violation of Antonina Krivoshapka, all three of Gushchina's Olympic medals have been taken away.

In the 2009 World Championships in Berlin, Gushchina changed from the 400 m to the 200 m and competed, she reached the 200 m semi-finals but narrowly missed out to the finals, in the 4 × 100 m relay Russia were fourth in the final a great disappointment, Jamaica won, Bahamas 2nd and Germany 3rd.

In the 2013 World Championships, during the medal ceremony for the women's 4×400 metres relay images of Kseniya Ryzhova and Yuliya Gushchina sharing a kiss on the lips spread through social media and were interpreted as a protest against the anti-gay laws. Both Ryzhova and Gushchina denied any intention to make such a protest, rather they were simply happy with their athletic success, and stated that they were married to men. Although reports were principally focused on the pair, all four of the Russia relay runners briefly kissed each other on the podium. Ryzhova described her assumed connection to LGBT as insulting. The Russian Minister for Sport, Vitaly Mutko, said that Western media had over-emphasised the issue, noting that same-sex relations are not illegal in Russia and sparser coverage of the issue in domestic media.

International competitions

Personal bests
100 metres – 11.13 s (2006)
200 metres – 22.53 s (2005)
400 metres – 49.28 s (2012)

See also
List of doping cases in athletics

Notes

References

External links

1983 births
Living people
People from Novocherkassk
Sportspeople from Rostov Oblast
Russian female sprinters
Olympic female sprinters
Olympic athletes of Russia
Athletes (track and field) at the 2008 Summer Olympics
Athletes (track and field) at the 2012 Summer Olympics
Competitors stripped of Summer Olympics medals
World Athletics Championships athletes for Russia
World Athletics Indoor Championships winners
World Athletics Indoor Championships medalists
European Athletics Championships winners
European Athletics Championships medalists
Russian Athletics Championships winners
World Athletics indoor record holders (relay)
Russian sportspeople in doping cases
Doping cases in athletics
21st-century Russian women